The Clark Range is a mountain range that forms part of the Continental Divide and also the boundary between the Canadian provinces of Alberta and British Columbia. A small portion of the range extends into the far northwestern section of Glacier National Park, Montana, United States. It is the easternmost of the Border Ranges subdivision of the Canadian Rockies.  The range is named for Captain William Clark of the Lewis and Clark Expedition.

This range includes the following mountains and peaks:

References

Mountain ranges of Alberta
Mountain ranges of British Columbia
Mountains of Glacier National Park (U.S.)
Mountain ranges of Montana
Ranges of the Canadian Rockies
Ranges of the Rocky Mountains
Elk Valley (British Columbia)